Andres Nuiamäe (2 June 1982 in Lehtse, Lääne-Viru County, Estonia – 28 February 2004 in Iraq) was a Junior Sergeant of the Estonian Ground Forces, assigned to the ESTPLA-8 unit in Baghdad, Iraq.

Biography
Andres Nuiamäe was 21 years when he was killed, while fighting with coalition forces in Baghdad, in the line of duty by an improvised explosive device at 20:55 local time. He holds the distinction of being the first Estonian soldier serving in an independent Estonian army to be killed in combat since 1920, and the first Estonian soldier to be killed in the Iraq War.

Nuiamäe's death shocked the population of Estonia and sparked a debate amongst the country's citizens on whether Estonia should continue to keep troops stationed in Iraq. However, the Estonian government held firm in its stance to remain part of the "Coalition of the Willing". In a prepared statement released shortly after Andres Nuiamäe's death, Estonian Prime Minister Juhan Parts said:

"This is an extremely painful reminder that the situation in Iraq has not yet stabilized and that joint efforts for peace by the coalition forces are well founded."

Following Nuiamäe's funeral, the President of Estonia, Arnold Rüütel, released the following statement on 29 February 2004:

"I express profound sympathy and condolences to the family, loved ones and fellow servicemen of Andres Nuiamäe. The death of this brave young man in Iraq is an irretrievable loss to both his family and the whole of Estonia. At this sad moment, let us all think about duty, sense of responsibility, mission and the price of ensuring it. Estonia is mourning."

On 26 October 2004, Estonia suffered its second Iraqi War casualty when 28-year-old First Sergeant Arre Illenzeer was similarly killed by explosives.

References

MSN News item
The Iraq Page
Postimees news item 
United States Embassy Press Release

NATO: Estonian Defence Digest
CNN News item

1982 births
2004 deaths
People from Tapa Parish
Estonian military personnel killed in action
Military personnel killed in action in the Iraq War